Novotroitsk is a rural locality (a settlement) in Mirnensky Selsoviet, Rodinsky District, Altai Krai, Russia. The population was 321 as of 2013. There are 8 streets.

Geography 
Novotroitsk is located by the Kuchuk river, 19 km north of Rodino (the district's administrative centre) by road. Mirny is the nearest rural locality.

References 

Rural localities in Rodinsky District